Stephen Andrews is a Canadian artist based in Toronto. Born in 1956 in Sarnia, Ontario, Andrews is known for using various media to explore matters such as memory and loss, and technology, and its representations.

Art practice 
Using images sourced from newspapers, television, film and the internet, Andrews creates hand-crafted works in a range of mediums, including oil, latex, crayon, silkscreen and linoleum-cut printing, rubber stamps, and animation. A distinctive feature of Andrews’ art is his interest in creating the look of mechanical reproduction using different techniques. The artist has stated that in his work he renders: 
“the digital, the dot matrix in print reproduction, film or television technologies...by hand in an attempt to represent both the message and the means by which it is delivered.”  
By using a technique that gives equal weight to both media and message of his chosen topics, Andrews creates a space for reflection on our daily consumption of the imagery we get from what he calls "virtual or ether" media. The portrait series of graphite-and-oil-rubbed wax tablets, Facsimile (1991-1992) uses obituary portraits of men who have died from HIV/AIDS as source material, “reproduced from faxed images...the details are pixellated, smudgy.”  By this method, “Facsimile... designates the technology of reproduction and transmission that inhabits the images.”  Atom Egoyan writing about a show he curated of Andrews’ work notes, “Facsimile’s most haunting aspect...is how it traces the erosion and evolution of personal identity from an anonymous mediated source.”

While Andrews’ output prior to 1996 tends to be in black and white or monochrome, around this time he introduced colour into his work. The Weather Series (1996) begins the artists’ extended investigation into the processes of colour generation and the four-colour separation printing processes. For Andrews, weather provides an analogy for the quickly changing circumstances of life, which he likens to his own experience of living with HIV. Andrews’ method of homemade colour separation evokes both the 19th-century painting technique of Pointillism “in which small, distinct dots of pure color are applied in patterns to form an image”, and the Ben-Day dots of mechanical printing. But Andrews creates works that “hover at legibility.” “The pixilation or dot matrix completely obscures details, making specifics impossible to see. We can't grasp the full picture.“ The series of rubbed-crayon drawings, The Quick and the Dead (2004), feature stills derived from video footage of the Iraq war. Considered in relation to the source material Andrews uses, the work has political implications, "suggesting the impossibility of knowing the circumstances and contexts of what they depict". The artist has stated the series is: 
“my response to the lack of photographic evidence of the war...information was really only available on websites at that time. The disposability of these media images is in stark contrast to the effects on the lives of those involved.“  Andrews also used 600 drawings from the series to create his one minute animation, The Quick and the Dead (2004). In Cartoon (2007), he continues to use media sources to create drawings.

Trump Tower Commission (Toronto) 
The Trump Tower in Toronto commissioned a mosaic version of the  Andrews’ work A small part of something larger (2009). As part of his development of the work, Andrews created The View From Here a large-scale triptych of a “tightly cropped crowd scene” The mosaic of 500,000 small porcelain, glass, stone and gold tiles was crafted by Montreal-based Mosaika Art & Design.

Selected publications 

Stephen Andrews: Picture Maker, Alexander Nagel, Canadian Art, Winter (2007)
Subtitles, Atom Egoyan ed., Alphabet City No. 9 (2005) 
Lost in the Archives, Rebecca Comay ed., Alphabet City No. 7 
Stephen Andrews, Cue Art Foundation (2004) ASIN: B00420R4FI
Stephen Andrews: Likeness, A. Hurtig, S. Watson eds. (2001) 
Autobiography, North Dakota Museum of Art (1995)
Stephen Andrews: Facsimile, Oakville Galleries (1992) 
Dark O'Clock, Plug In Editions (1995) ASIN: B00319N9VO

Selected exhibitions 
 Andrews, POV, Art Gallery of Ontario, Toronto, 2015
 X, Paul Petro Contemporary Art, Toronto, 2012
 Stephen Andrews, Illingworth Kerr Gallery, ACAD, 2011
 It Is What It Is, Recent Acquisitions, National Gallery of Canada, Ottawa, 2010
 Cartoon, The Power Plant, Toronto, 2007
 As above, so below, Paul Petro Contemporary Art, Toronto, 2009
 The Quick and the Dead, Gallery Lambton, Sarnia, 2008
 Biennale de Montreal, 2007
 Forecast, JB Gallery Hart House University of Toronto, Toronto, 2006
 A deer in the headlights (remix), Platform Gallery, Seattle
 Stephen Andrews, Cue Art Foundation, New York, 2004
 The 1st part of the 2nd half, Dazibao, Montreal, 2002
 Likeness, Helen and Morris Belkin Gallery, UBC, 2001

Selected public collections 
Art Gallery of Hamilton
Art Gallery of Ontario, Toronto
National Gallery of Canada, Ottawa
Oakville Galleries, Oakville, Ontario
Agnes Etherington Art Centre, Kingston, Ontario
Art Museum, University of Toronto
Judith & Norman Alix Art Gallery, Sarnia, Ontario

Awards 
Governor General's Award in Visual and Media Arts (2019)

References

Bibliography

External links 
http://www.stephenandrewsartist.com
CCCA Artist Profile http://www.ccca.ca/artists/artist_info.html?link_id=521
Paul Petro Contemporary Art http://www.paulpetro.com/artists/10-Stephen-Andrews/CV

Canadian mixed media artists
1956 births
Living people
Artists from Ontario
People from Sarnia
Canadian gay artists
Governor General's Award in Visual and Media Arts winners
20th-century Canadian artists
21st-century Canadian artists
21st-century Canadian LGBT people
20th-century Canadian LGBT people